The 1922 Franklin & Marshall football team was an American football team that represented Franklin & Marshall College during the 1922 college football season. The team compiled an 8–2 record and outscored opponents by a total of 279 to 32.  John B. Price was the team's head coach.

Schedule

References

Franklin and Marshall
Franklin & Marshall Diplomats football seasons
Franklin and Marshall football